9 Andromedae, abbreviated 9 And by convention, is a variable binary star system in the northern constellation Andromeda. 9 Andromedae is the Flamsteed designation, while it bears the variable star designation AN Andromedae, or AN And. The maximum apparent visual magnitude of the system is 5.98, which places it near the lower limit of visibility to the human eye.

This system was determined to be a single-lined spectroscopic binary in 1916 by American astronomer W. S. Adams, and the initial orbital elements were computed by Canadian astronomer R. K. Young in 1920. The pair orbit each other with a period of 3.2196 days and an eccentricity of 0.03. It is an eclipsing binary, which means the orbital plane is inclined close to the line of sight  and, from the perspective of the Earth, the stars pass in front of each other, causing two partial eclipses every orbit. During the transit of the secondary in front of the primary, the visual magnitude drops to 6.16, while the eclipse of the secondary by the primary lowers the net magnitude to 6.09.

References

External links
 Image 9 Andromedae

AN Andromedae
9 Andromedae
Durchmusterung objects
Andromedae, 09
219815
115065
8864
Andromedae, AN
Eclipsing binaries
A-type main-sequence stars